Events from the 1320s in England.

Incumbents
Monarch – Edward II (to 25 January 1327), then Edward III

Events
 1320
 Walter de Stapledon appointed as Lord High Treasurer.
 Many horses die of a disease called "Ffarsine".
 1321
 May – Marcher lords seize the lands of Hugh le Despenser, 1st Earl of Winchester.
 28 June – Thomas, 2nd Earl of Lancaster holds an assembly at Sherburn-in-Elmet demanding administrative reforms and denouncing Hugh le Despenser.
 14 August – Edward II is forced to banish his most loyal baron, Hugh le Despenser, and his son Hugh the younger.
 Construction of the Lady Chapel at Ely Cathedral begins.
 First recorded tower clock in England constructed, at Norwich Cathedral.
 Famine recurs.
 1322
 12/13 February – the central tower of Ely Cathedral collapses.
 10 March – Battle of Burton Bridge, part of the Despenser War: Edward II drives off rebel forces.
 16 March – at the Battle of Boroughbridge, Edward II defeats rebellious barons.
 22 March – Earl of Lancaster executed in Pontefract.
 14 October – First War of Scottish Independence – Battle of Old Byland: Robert the Bruce of Scotland defeats English troops near Byland Abbey in North Yorkshire.
 1323
 30 May – Edward II makes a 13-year truce with Scotland.
 24–30 October - Edward II stays at Liverpool Castle.
 Walter de Stapledon conducts a major re-organisation of government records and financial rolls.
Northallerton Free School founded.
 1324
 August – War of Saint-Sardos: France invades Gascony.
 William of Ockham summoned before the Papal court at Avignon on charges of heresy.
 Monarch's right to royal fish recognised by statute.
 1325
 9 March – Edward II's wife, Isabella of France, travels to France to negotiate a truce with Charles IV of France.
 24 September – Edward of Windsor goes to France to pay homage for Gascony, and remains there with his mother.
 1326
 19 January – Roger de Beler, a Baron of the Exchequer, is murdered by the Folville gang.
 27 August – Isabella of France arranges the betrothal of Edward of Windsor to Philippa of Hainault, in return for military support in her planned invasion of England.
 24 September – an army led by Isabella and Roger Mortimer lands in Suffolk.
 2 October – Edward II flees to Gloucester.
 15 October – Walter de Stapledon, Bishop of Exeter (a supporter of the king) is murdered by the mob in London. 
 27 October – Hugh le Despenser, 1st Earl of Winchester, hanged, drawn and quartered at Bristol.
 16 November – Edward II captured at Neath Abbey.
 24 November – Hugh Despenser the Younger hanged, drawn and quartered at Hereford.
 Richard of Wallingford constructs a great public clock at St. Albans.
 Probable foundation of Hanley Castle Grammar School in Worcestershire.
 1327
 7 January–9 March – Parliament of 1327, sitting at the Palace of Westminster, is instrumental in the transfer of the crown.
 January – outbreak of rioting against monastic establishments in St Albans and Bury St Edmunds; extends to Abingdon in April.
 20 January – Edward II, incarcerated at Kenilworth Castle, abdicates. This is announced in London on 24 January.
 25 January –  the 14-year-old Edward III is proclaimed King in London in place of his father, Edward II. His mother Isabella and Mortimer rule as regents.
 1 February – coronation of Edward III at Westminster Abbey.
 31 March – Charles IV of France (Isabella's brother) makes peace with Edward III, returning Gascony to English control.
 4 August – First War of Scottish Independence: Scottish forces defeat the English at the Battle of Stanhope Park.
 10 August – John Grandisson nominated as Bishop of Exeter (consecrated 18 October); he will serve for more than forty years.
 21 September – death of Edward II at Berkeley Castle, later rumoured to be murdered.
 De Officiis Regum written by Walter de Milemete; the oldest known text to include an illustration of a cannon.
 1328
 24 January – marriage of Edward III to Philippa of Hainault at York Minster.
 1 May – by the Treaty of Edinburgh-Northampton, England recognises Scotland as an independent nation after the Wars of Scottish Independence.
 5 June – Simon Mepeham enthroned as Archbishop of Canterbury.
 17 July – Edward III's sister Joan marries David Bruce, son of the Scottish King.
 October – Mortimer proclaims himself Earl of March.
 Willam of Ockham flees Avignon and seeks refuge with the Holy Roman Emperor Louis IV of Bavaria.
 Reconstruction of Exeter Cathedral in the Decorated Gothic style begins.
 A storm surge on the Suffolk coast chokes the harbour of Dunwich and sweeps away the village of Newton.
 St. Catherine's Oratory lighthouse on the Isle of Wight is completed.
 1329
 Establishment of the predecessor of The King's School, Grantham.
 Establishment of Kilve Chantry in Somerset.

Births
 1320
 John Hawkwood, mercenary (died 1394)
 William of Wykeham, Bishop of Winchester (died 1404)
 John Chandos, knight (died 1369)
 1323
 30 October- Lady Seraphia Greystone Of Yorkshire (died 1399
 1325
William de Ros, 3rd Baron de Ros (died 1352)
 1328
 25 June – William de Montacute, 2nd Earl of Salisbury, military leader (died 1397)
 29 September – Joan of Kent, wife of Edward, the Black Prince (died 1385)
 11 November – Roger Mortimer, 2nd Earl of March (died 1360)

Deaths
 1321
 9 November – Walter Langton, Bishop of Lichfield and treasurer of England
 1322
 16 March – Humphrey de Bohun, 4th Earl of Hereford, soldier (born 1276)
 22 March – Thomas, Earl of Lancaster, politician (born 1278)
 14 April – Bartholomew de Badlesmere, 1st Lord Badlesmere, soldier (born 1275)
 3 December – Maud Chaworth, Countess of Leicester (born 1282)
 1323
 3 March – Andrew Harclay, 1st Earl of Carlisle, military leader (born c. 1276)
 1324
 23 June – Aymer de Valence, 2nd Earl of Pembroke (born c. 1275)
 1 November – John de Halton, Bishop of Carlisle (year of birth unknown)
 1326
 14 October – Walter de Stapledon, Bishop of Exeter and Lord High Treasurer (born 1261)
 27 October – Hugh le Despenser, 1st Earl of Winchester, chief adviser to Edward II (born 1261)
 17 November – Edmund FitzAlan, 9th Earl of Arundel, politician (born 1285)
 24 November – Hugh the younger Despenser, knight (born 1286)
 1327
 24 June – James Berkeley, Bishop of Exeter
 21 September – King Edward II of England (born 1284)
 16 November – Walter Reynolds, Archbishop of Canterbury

References